The President of the City Assembly of Belgrade ( / Predsednik Skupštine grada Beograda) is the speaker of the City Assembly of Belgrade, capital of Serbia. The President's term lasts four years, and is elected by members of each new assembly. The current President of the City Assembly of Belgrade is Nikola Nikodijević (SPS). He was elected on 23 April 2014, following the 2014 City Assembly election, and re-elected twice – on 9 May 2018, following the 2018 City Assembly election, and on 11 June 2022, following the 2022 City Assembly election.

The offices of the President of the City Assembly of Belgrade and the Mayor of Belgrade were merged and held by the same person until 2004, when they were separated.

Office
According to the current legislation, the City Assembly elects the President and Deputy President of the City Assembly of Belgrade from the complement of the councilors for the four years’ term.

Authorities (competences)
Organizing the work of the City Assembly;
Summoning sessions, suggesting the agenda and presiding over the City Assembly sessions;
Looking after implementation of the transparency of work of the City Assembly;
Signing bylaws adopted by the City Assembly, and
Performing any other operations entrusted by the City Assembly.

List of presidents

References

See also
City Assembly of Belgrade
Mayor of Belgrade

Belgrade, City Assembly
Government of Belgrade
President of the City Assembly of Belgrade